Marion Arthur Kelts (April 30, 1890 – April 1, 1971) was a provincial politician from Alberta, Canada. He served as a member of the Legislative Assembly of Alberta from 1959 to 1963 sitting with the Social Credit caucus in government.

Political career
Kelts ran for a seat to the Alberta Legislature as a Social Credit candidate in the 1959 Alberta general election in the Acadia-Coronation electoral district. He won the hotly contested three-way race defeating incumbent James Sims.

Kelts did not run for a second term in office and retired at dissolution of the assembly in 1963.

References

External links
Legislative Assembly of Alberta Members Listing

Alberta Social Credit Party MLAs
American emigrants to Canada
1971 deaths
1890 births